The Arthur VanderSys House is a historic residence in Mobile, Alabama, United States.  It was built in 1926 in the Spanish Colonial Revival style. The building was placed on the National Register of Historic Places on July 12, 1991.  It is a part of the Spanish Revival Residences in Mobile Multiple Property Submission.

References

National Register of Historic Places in Mobile, Alabama
Houses in Mobile, Alabama
Houses on the National Register of Historic Places in Alabama
Spanish Colonial Revival architecture in Alabama
Houses completed in 1926